Stachel is a surname. Notable people with the surname include:

Ari'el Stachel (born 1991), American actor
Hellmuth Stachel (born 1942), Austrian mathematician
Jack Stachel (1900–1965), American communist
John Stachel (born 1928), American physicist
Johanna Stachel (born 1954), German physicist